is a city in Yamagata Prefecture, Japan. , the city had an estimated population of  125,389 in 49,024 households, and a population density of 95.74 persons per km². Tsuruoka is the biggest city in Tōhoku region in terms of surface area.

Today's Tsuruoka is the result of the fusion of several neighborhoods around the center of the city such as Atsumi, Asahi, Fujishima, Kushibiki, and Haguro in 1953.

Geography
Tsuruoka is located on the coast of Yamagata Prefecture bordering the Sea of Japan and has some locally popular beaches such as Yunohama and Sanze. All three of the Three Mountains of Dewa are at least partially within the city limits.

Two main rivers run through Tsuruoka, the Akagawa River (赤川, literally "Red River"), and the Mogami River.

Neighboring municipalities
Yamagata Prefecture
Sakata
Shōnai
Nishikawa
Mikawa
Niigata Prefecture
Murakami

Climate
Tsuruoka has a Humid continental climate (Köppen climate classification Cfa) with large seasonal temperature differences, with warm to hot (and often humid) summers and cold (sometimes severely cold) winters. Precipitation is significant throughout the year but is heaviest from August to October. The region is known for its heavy snowfalls during the winter, and people living in Sekigawa and Atsumi's neighborhoods can expect up to 2 meters of snow which after removal creates very particular snow walls standing high along the road. The first snows usually come in late November but the real peak is generally around January. The red leaves appear generally at the end of October and end in mid-November.

Demographics
Per Japanese census data, the population of Tsuruoka has declined in recent decades.

History
The area of present-day Tsuruoka was part of ancient Dewa Province, and was under the control of the Shōnai Domain under the Tokugawa shogunate in the Edo period. It was a minor port for the kitamaebune coastal trade.
 
After the start of the Meiji period, the area organized as Tsuruoka Town under Nishitagawa District, Yamagata Prefecture in 1878. It was elevated to city status on October 1, 1924, becoming Japan's 100th city. In 1955, the city expanded by annexing the town of Kamo and nine neighboring villages. The town of Oyama was annexed by Tsuruoka in 1963.

On October 1, 2005, the towns of Fujishima, Haguro and Kushibiki, and the village of Asahi (all from Higashitagawa District), and the town of Atsumi (from Nishitagawa District) were merged into Tsuruoka.

Government
Tsuruoka has a mayor-council form of government with a directly elected mayor and a unicameral city legislature of 24 members. The city contributes five members to the Yamagata Prefectural Assembly. In terms of national politics, the city is part of Yamagata District 3 of the lower house of the Diet of Japan.

Economy
Tsuruoka has a mixed economy based on light manufacturing, commercial services, agriculture, and commercial fishing.

Education
Tsuruoka has 26 public elementary schools and 11public middle schools operated by the city government and six public high schools operated by the Yamagata Prefectural Board of Education. There are also two private high schools. The prefecture also operates two special education schools for the handicapped.

Colleges and universities
 Yamagata University, Faculty of Agriculture
 Keio University, Institute for Advanced Biosciences (Tsuruoka Town Campus and Metabolome Campus)
 Tohoku University of Community Service and Science (Tsuruoka Campus)
 Tsuruoka National College of Technology

High schools

 Tsuruoka Minami High School
 Tsuruoka Kita High School
 Tsuruoka Kamo Fisheries High School
 Tsuruoka Higashi High School
 Tsuruoka Kogyo High School

 Tsuruoka Chuo High School
 Yamazoe High School
 Shonai Agricultural High School
 Haguro High School

Junior high schools

 Tsuruoka Daiichi Junior High School
 Tsuruoka Daini Junior High School
 Tsuruoka Daisan Junior High School
 Tsuruoka Daiyon Junior High School
 Tsuruoka Daigo Junior High School
 Tsuruoka Toyoura Junior High School

 Tsuruoka Fujishima Junior High School
 Tsuruoka Haguro Junior High School
 Tsuruoka Kushibiki Junior High School
 Tsuruoka Asahi Junior High School
 Tsuruoka Atsumi Junior High School

Elementary schools

 Tsuruoka Choyo Daiichi Elementary School
 Tsuruoka Choyo Daini Elementary School
 Tsuruoka Choyo Daisan Elementary School
 Tsuruoka Choyo Daiyon Elementary School
 Tsuruoka Choyo Daigo Elementary School
 Tsuruoka Choyo Dairoku Elementary School
 Tsuruoka Itsuki Elementary School
 Tsuruoka Kogane Elementary School
 Tsuruoka Oizumi Elementary School
 Tsuruoka Yutagawa Elementary School
 Tsuruoka Kyoden Elementary School
 Tsuruoka Tagawa Elementary School

 Tsuruoka Sanze Elementary School
 Tsuruoka Kogata Elementary School
 Tsuruoka Yura Elementary School
 Tsuruoka Kamo Elementary School
 Tsuruoka Yunohama Elementary School
 Tsuruoka Oyama Elementary School
 Tsuruoka Nishigo Elementary School
 Tsuruoka Kamigo Elementary School
 Tsuruoka Fujishima Elementary School
 Tsuruoka Toei Elementary School
 Tsuruoka Watamae Elementary School
 Tsuruoka Haguro Elementary School

 Tsuruoka Hirose Elementary School
 Tsuruoka Kushibiki Higashi Elementary School
 Tsuruoka Kushibiki Nishi Elementary School
 Tsuruoka Kushibiki Minami Elementary School
 Tsuruoka Otsuna Elementary School
 Tsuruoka Asahi Elementary School
 Tsuruoka Atsumi Elementary School
 Tsuruoka Iragawa Elementary School
 Tsuruoka Nezugaseki Elementary School
 Tsuruoka Fukuei Elementary School
 Tsuruoka Yamato Elementary School

Health care
 Tsuruoka Shonai Hospital
 Tsuruoka Kyoritsu Hospital
 Yutagawa Onsen Rehabilitation Medical Center

Transportation

Airports
 Shonai Airport

Railway
 East Japan Railway Company - Uetsu Main Line
 -  -  -  -  -  -  -  -  -

Highway
 : Yudonosan, Shōnai Asahi, Tsuruoka interchanges

Media

TV
 NHK Tsuruoka Broadcast Station

Newspapers
 Shonai Nippo

Culture

The Mountain Spirit 
Tsuruoka is mostly known for its "Three Mountains of Dewa", which refers to Mt. Haguro, the smallest mount that culminates at only 436m high; Mt. Gassan, the highest mount at 1984m; and Mt. Yudono, at 1500m.

Yamabushi and Shugendô 

Those three mounts are considered as the core of Shugendô's practice. Shugendô 修験道(literally: The way of the ascetic practice) is often perceived as a form of syncretism of Shintô 神道, religion and Buddhism. The Yamabushi 山伏, literally : "the men who sleep in the Mountain" (men who practice shugendô) believe in Buddha but also believe that a god resides in all things that exist in nature. Yamabushi, those men who wear a checked vest and blow in a trumpet shell to communicate with their peers and to keep the bad spirits away, aim to protect the mountain and to live a sinless life connected to the nature.

The pilgrimage of all the three mounts is done in that sense. The three mounts symbolically represent death and rebirth. By going down and up the 2466 stone stairs of the mount Haguro, people can experiment a "symbolic death" and "rebirth", after which they can access to the world of the dead represented by Mt. Gassan and its foggy landscapes, and then go purify their body and their soul in Mt. Yudono's natural hotsprings. 

Shôjin ryôri 精進料理 ("food for spiritual elevation"), a vegan food traditionally consumed by Yamabushi, uses no animal product but sansai 山菜 ("Mountain vegetables") instead, as well as local rice, handmade gomadôfu ごま豆腐 (sesame-flavoured tôfu), bamboo sprouts, vinegared chrysanthemum flowers and mushrooms. There exists a lot of different shôjin ryôri depending on the shukubô 宿坊 (temples that also welcome travellers for the night) that serves it, but it usually consists in a lot of small dishes accompanied with a miso soup and white rice.

National Treasures 
Mt. Haguro hosts The Five-Storied Pagoda (gojûnotô 五重塔), one of Japan's National Treasures. The pagoda's central pillar protects it from earthquakes, which inspired Tokyo's Skytree's architecture. Also in the grounds of Mt. Haguro is the Jiji-sugi 爺杉 ("Grandpa cedar"), a 30m high cedar that exists for more than 1000 years.

Culinary culture

Heritage and creativity 
In 2014, Tsuruoka has been registered as a UNESCO Creative City of Gastronomy. Its more than 50 species of "ancestral food" (zairai sakumotsu 在来作物) that exist and remain intact for several centuries now are one of the reasons why the city has received this title. Among these there are: minden nasu 民田なす (a round eggplant with a long and thin hat),  からとりいも (spiciness-sweetener potato),  温海かぶ (Atsumi turnip, a red turnip that grows on sharp slopes), ootaki carrot 大滝ニンジン, etc. The presence of such ancient food is not the only reason why Tsuruoka has been registered as a Creative City of Gastronomy. Its particular way to cook these ingredients was even more determinant. Tsuruoka's most known specialties are: kandarajiru 寒鱈汁 (a soup containing black cod fished during the winter – the period when it is supposed to be tastier), gomadôfu ごま豆腐 (sesame-flavoured tôfu), tochimochi とちもち (chestnut flavoured pound rice cake), kitsunemen キツネ面 (fox mask shaped black sugar biscuit), etc.

The city is also known for its large variety of soups (it is said the harsh cold during the winter is the reason why there are so many types of hot soups in Tsuruoka), apart from kandarajiru, there is takenokojiru タケノコ汁 (Mt Gassan bamboo soup), imoni 芋煮 (potato soup), nattôjiru 納豆汁 (nattô based soup), môsô jiru (another type of bamboo soup).

Peas 

 are used in any kind of meal: sweet, salty, spicy, bitter, sour, just boiled, crushed, grilled, and in sauces.

Dadakko (だだっ子), are small cakes which contain a sweet  paste. Dadappai (だだっパイ) are small  pasted inside a puff pastry. There are also  flavored ice creams, cookies, biscuits, creams.

Seafood 
Tsuruoka and the whole region of Shônai benefit from a large variety of fishes and sea food coming from the Sea of Japan. Among all the local sea foods you can find in Tsuruoka, there are: Cherry salmon, Japanese seabream, blue crab, littlemouth flounder, flatfish, black rockfish, tonguefish, flying squid, oyster, sea robin, sandfish, Japanese codfish, and others. The huge variety of fresh local fishes and seafood in Tsuruoka had contributed to the local sushi shops' good reputation, but it has also helped constitute a very particular kind of "family gastronomy", where fishes hold a very important place.

Rice 
The rice cultivated in Tsuruoka and more generally in Shonai region has been recognized for its strong umami taste. In 2010, searchers from Keiô University's Institute for Advanced Biosciences 慶應義塾大学先端生命科学研究所 have proven Tsuyahime local rice brand contained 1.5x more umami taste than the common other brands of rice thanks to the studies of metabolomes.

Arts and crafts 
The city is literally surrounded by plains, forests and mountains. Thus, wood and grass were largely used in all kinds of crafts. As for architecture, thatch-roofed houses (kayabukiyane かやぶき屋根) are one of the symbols of the city. Some of them remained in good condition through centuries now as for example Tasôminka 多層民家 (the several-layered house), a traditional farmer house from Meiji period, and the house in Chidô Museum 致道博物館.

Concerning clothing, shinaori しな織り, is a traditional weaving style from tree bark that is still performed these days. The items created with this solid and firm thread are very resistant and waterproof.

Local attractions
 Yamabushi Training at Ideha Culture Museum (いでは文化記念館, "Ideha Bunka Kinenkan")
 Mt. Haguro
 Zenpō Temple（善宝寺, - Where, in 1990, a carp fish with a human-like face was seen in a pond on the temple grounds.）
 Chido Museum（到道博物館,“Chido Hakubutsukan”）
 Shōnai Shrine
 Yutagawa Hot Spring
 Yunohama Hot Spring
Atsumi Hot Spring
 Dewa-no-Yuki Shuzō Museum
 Tsuruoka Art Forum
 Dewa Shōnai Kokusai Mura International Forum and the Amazon Folk Museum
 Gassan Asahi Museum
 Tsuruoka Kamo Aquarium（加茂水族館, “Kamo-Suizokukan”.This is registered in Guinness for the number of jellyfish exhibits.）

Local events 
 Saitansai (New Year Ceremony) in Mt. Haguro Shrine - January 1
 Ogisai Kurokawa Noh (Noh Festival) in Kushibiki - February 1 to 2
 Oyama Sake Festival - Middle of February
 Mt. Yudono Ski Festival in Mt. Yudono - From middle to late February
 Tsuruoka Hinamatsuri in Shonai Temple and Chido Museum - March
 Tsuruoka Sakura Festival in Tsuruoka Park - From middle to late April
 Tulip Festival in Ikoi Village Shonai - From late April to Early May
 Amazon Kid Festival in Gassan Asahi Village - May 3 to 5
 Ceremony for Women and Children in Mt. Haguro Shrine - May 5
 Kinensai (Prayer service for a good crop) in Mt. Haguro Shrine - May 8
 International Nordic Walk in Yunohama - Middle of May
 Tenjin Festival - May 25
 Oyama Dog Festival - June 5
 Yutagawa Hot Spring Hotaru Matsuri (Firefly Festival) - June 15 to August 10
 Flower Festival in Mt. Haguro - July 15
 Gassan Shrine Festival in Mt. Gassan - July 15
 International Bungee jumping in Gassan Asahi Village - Middle of July
 Edamame Shop Open in Shirayama - Late July to Late August
 Akagawa Fireworks Festival - Middle of August
 Oku no Hosomichi National Haiku Competition at Ideha Bunka Kinenkan - Middle of September
 Experience:Yamabushi Training at Ideha Bunka Kinenkan - Middle of September
 Miss Shonai Contest - Late October
 Shonai Hyakuman-goku Festival - Early November
 Shôreisai 松例祭 - Last day of December. Through different rites involving trees and fires, Yamabushi pray for a good rice harvest and the good health of the crops.

International relations

Twin towns – Sister cities
Tsuruoka is twinned with:

 Kagoshima, Kagoshima, Japan
 – Kikonai, Hokkaido, since April 27, 1989
 – New Brunswick, New Jersey, USA, since June 10, 1960
 - La Foa, New Caledonia
 - Shangzhi, Heilongjiang, China

Notable people from Tsuruoka 
Koichi Kato (LDP), politician
Kashiwado Tsuyoshi, sumo wrestler
Takashi Ishikawa, sumo wrestler
Rentaro Kita, musician
Kanji Ishiwara, general in the Imperial Japanese Army
Satō Tetsutarō, admiral in the Imperial Japanese Navy
Tomegoro Yoshizumi, spy and defector to Indonesia
Shuhei Fujisawa, writer
Ishirō Honda, movie director
Shin Togashi, movie director
Saiichi Maruya, writer and literary critic
Ryo Chonan, mixed martial artist
Shōichi Watanabe, English scholar
Yuya Hasegawa, professional baseball player

References

External links

Official Website 
Official tourism website 
Official English website

 
Cities in Yamagata Prefecture
Populated coastal places in Japan